The 2005–06 All-Ireland Senior Club Hurling Championship was the 36th staging of the All-Ireland Senior Club Hurling Championship, the Gaelic Athletic Association's premier inter-county club hurling tournament. The championship began on 30 October 2005 and ended on 17 March 2006.

James Stephens were the defending champions but were defeated by Portumna in the All-Ireland semi-final.

On 17 March 2006 Portumna won the championship following a 2-8 to 1-6 defeat of Newtownshandrum in the All-Ireland final. This was their first All-Ireland title.

James Stephens's Eoin Larkin was the championship's top scorer with 2-27.

Results

Connacht Senior Club Hurling Championship

Quarter-finals

Semi-final

Final

Leinster Senior Club Hurling Championship

First round

Quarter-finals

Semi-finals

Final

Munster Senior Club Hurling Championship

Quarter-finals

Semi-finals

Final

Ulster Senior Club Hurling Championship

Final

All-Ireland Senior Club Hurling Championship

Semi-finals

Final

Top scorers

Overall

Single game

External links
 2005-06 All-Ireland Senior Club Hurling Championship results

References

2005 in hurling
2006 in hurling
All-Ireland Senior Club Hurling Championship